Lori Petty (born October 14, 1963) is an American actress, director, and screenwriter. She is noted for her roles in the films Point Break (1991), A League of Their Own (1992), Free Willy  (1993), and the title role in Tank Girl (1995).

Petty joined the Netflix original series Orange Is the New Black as Lolly Whitehill as a guest star in the second season, and a recurring character in the third, fourth and seventh seasons.

Early life
Petty, the eldest of three children, was born in Chattanooga, Tennessee, the daughter of a Pentecostal minister. She graduated from North High School in Sioux City, Iowa, in 1981, and worked for several years in Omaha, Nebraska, as a graphic designer before pursuing acting.

Career
Petty got her break starring with Richard Grieco in Fox's Booker. In 1990, Petty made her film debut as Robin Williams's wannabe fashion designer girlfriend in Cadillac Man. The following year, Petty played the surfer who taught Keanu Reeves how to surf in the 1991 action thriller Point Break. In 1992, Petty was featured in A League of Their Own, opposite Tom Hanks, Geena Davis, and Madonna.

She played the title role in the film adaptation of the British cult comic book Tank Girl in 1995. Her other films include Free Willy, The Poker House, and In the Army Now. She also co-starred in the television series Lush Life with her friend Karyn Parsons, but it was cancelled after five episodes. She joined the cast of Brimstone as the owner of Stone's hotel.

Petty also provided the voice of the supervillain Livewire on the Warner Bros. series Superman: The Animated Series, and The New Batman Adventures. Although she was originally cast as Lt. Lenina Huxley in Demolition Man, disagreements over the character's direction led producer Joel Silver to recast the role with Sandra Bullock. Petty played the role of "Daddy", an alpha female inmate, in Prison Break: The Final Break.

She starred in a series of television commercials created by Merkley Newman Harty's Steve Bowen for the National Thoroughbred Racing Association's "Go, Baby, Go" advertising campaign in 1998.

Petty's directorial debut, The Poker House—a film dramatizing her own difficult childhood—won awards at the Los Angeles Film Festival. She narrated the first three books of Janet Evanovich's Stephanie Plum series—One for the Money, Two for the Dough, and Three to Get Deadly. C. J. Critt read the unabridged version for Recorded Books. Petty read the abridgments for Simon & Schuster.

In 2021, she starred in Station Eleven on HBO.

Filmography

Film

Television

Video games

References

External links

1963 births
20th-century American actresses
21st-century American actresses
Actors from Sioux City, Iowa
Actors from Iowa City, Iowa
Actresses from Iowa
Actresses from Tennessee
American film actresses
American television actresses
American voice actresses
Living people
People from Chattanooga, Tennessee
Writers from Sioux City, Iowa